Urban Center may refer to:
 Urban center, human settlement with a high population density and infrastructure of built environment
 Urban Center Plaza, plaza on the Portland State University campus in Portland, Oregon, United States
 Urban Center (gallery), on-profit membership organization for preservation in New York City, United States

See also 

 Urban area